Attorney General Fox may refer to:

Tim Fox (politician) (born 1957), Attorney General of Montana
William Fox (politician) (1812–1893), Attorney-General of New Zealand

See also
General Fox (disambiguation)